Fiji competed at the 2004 Summer Paralympics in Athens, Greece. The country was represented by two athletes competing in two sports. Neither Fijian won any medals.

Sarote Ravai Fiu was the first woman ever to compete for Fiji at the Paralympic Games.

Athletics

Swimming

See also
Fiji at the Paralympics
Fiji at the 2004 Summer Olympics

References

Nations at the 2004 Summer Paralympics
2004
Paralympics